The 49th Yasar Dogu Tournament 2021, was a wrestling event held in Istanbul, Turkey between 25 and 27 January 2021.

The international tournament included competition in both men's and women's freestyle wrestling. The tournament was held in honor of the two time Olympic Champion, Yaşar Doğu.

Medal table

Team ranking

Medal overview

Men's freestyle

Women's freestyle

Participating nations
191 competitors from 16 nations participated.

 (1)
 (2)
 (9)
 (8) 
 (5)
 (19)
 (3) 
 (13)
 (37)
 (12)
 (3)
 (3)
 (1) 
 (1)
 (4)
 (70)

See also
2021 Vehbi Emre & Hamit Kaplan Tournament
2021 Dan Kolov & Nikola Petrov Tournament
Golden Grand Prix Ivan Yarygin 2021
2021 Grand Prix Zagreb Open
Grand Prix de France Henri Deglane 2021
2021 Poland Open

References 

Yasar Dogu
2021 in sport wrestling
June 2021 sports events in Turkey
Sports competitions in Istanbul
Yaşar Doğu Tournament
International wrestling competitions hosted by Turkey